Epermenia lomatii is a moth in the family Epermeniidae. It was described by Reinhard Gaedike in 1977. It is found in North America, where it has been recorded from Alberta, Oregon, Washington and California.

References

Epermeniidae
Moths described in 1977
Moths of North America